Walk with Me is an debut studio album by Monika Linkytė, released on 17 September 2015 on the independent record label Gyva Muzika. Its third single "Po dangum" is most-viewed YouTube video in Lithuanian language.

Track listing

Awards and nominations

References 

2015 albums